Alex José da Cruz (born January 11, 1985) simply known as Alex Cruz a Brazilian attacking midfielder. He currently plays for Ferroviária.

Career statistics 
(Correct )

Honours
Ivinhema
 Campeonato Sul-Mato-Grossense: 2008

Flamengo
Campeonato Brasileiro Série A: 2009

References

External links

ogol.com.br 
Flapédia 

1985 births
Living people
Brazilian footballers
Campeonato Brasileiro Série A players
Campeonato Brasileiro Série D players
Americano Futebol Clube players
Esporte Clube Comercial (MS) players
Clube Esportivo Naviraiense players
Ivinhema Futebol Clube players
CR Flamengo footballers
Guarani FC players
Corumbaense Futebol Clube players
Associação Ferroviária de Esportes players
Association football midfielders
Sportspeople from Mato Grosso do Sul